Wintonopus is an ichnogenus of dinosaur footprint. Its footprints have been found at Lark Quarry in Queensland Australia. The genus is named after the Winton Formation in which the tracks were found. Other tracks were found in the Broome Sandstone of Dampier Peninsula, Western Australia.

See also
 List of dinosaur ichnogenera

References

Further reading
 
 S. W. Salisbury, A. Romilio, M. C. Herne, R. T. Tucker, and J. P. Nair. 2016. The Dinosaurian Ichnofauna of the Lower Cretaceous (Valanginian–Barremian) Broome Sandstone of the Walmadany Area (James Price Point), Dampier Peninsula, Western Australia. Society of Vertebrate Paleontology Memoir 16. Journal of Vertebrate Paleontology 36(6, suppl.):1-152
 R. A. Thulborn and M. Wade. 1984. Dinosaur trackways in the Winton Formation (mid-Cretaceous) of Queensland. Memoirs of the Queensland Museum 21(2):413-517

Dinosaur trace fossils
Cretaceous dinosaurs of Australia
Paleontology in Queensland
Geology of Western Australia
Fossil taxa described in 1984
Ornithopods